King Abdulaziz International Airport (KAIA) , also known as Jeddah International Airport, is an international airport serving Jeddah, Saudi Arabia.

The airport is the third-largest and the busiest airport of Saudi Arabia, serving more than 41 million passengers in 2018. Named after the founder of Saudi Arabia, King Abdulaziz Al Saud, the airport was inaugurated in 1981, serves the highest number of international travellers, and is the largest hub for Saudi Arabia's flag carrier, Saudia. The airport provides facilities required for the service of pilgrims and those who visit the country to perform Umrah.  It has three operational passenger terminals: the North Terminal,  the Hajj Terminal, and the new Terminal 1. The Hajj Terminal was specially built for Muslim pilgrims going to Mecca annually on the Hajj. The fourth terminal, which is the South terminal, was converted into a COVID-19 vaccine center in 2020.

Description
Beside the airport proper, this includes a royal terminal, facilities of King Abdullah Air Base for the Royal Saudi Air Force, and housing for airport staff. Construction work on KAIA airport began in 1974, and was finalized in 1980. Finally, on 31 May 1981, the airport opened for service after being officially inaugurated in April 1981.

New Terminal 1 
In 2019, the new Terminal 1 at King Abdulaziz International Airport had a soft opening with a number of domestic flights transferred to operate from it. Visitors and passengers will enjoy a number of facilities including new lounges, an  central garden area and a transport center that links between the building and the car park and train station. Furthermore, a mosque with a capacity of 3,732 worshippers has been established in the airport. In August 2019, the airport started moving a number of international flights operated by Saudia to the new terminal, and on the 18th of November, Etihad became the first non-Saudi airline to move to the new facility.

Facilities

Hajj Terminal
Because of Jeddah's proximity to the city of Mecca, the airport has a dedicated Hajj Terminal, built to handle pilgrims taking part in the rituals associated with the annual Hajj. It can accommodate 80,000 travelers at the same time.

Designed by the Bangladeshi-American engineer Fazlur Rahman Khan of the architectural firm Skidmore, Owings & Merrill LLP (SOM), it is known for its tent-like roof structure, engineered by Horst Berger while part of Geiger Berger Associates. Ten modules, each consisting of twenty-one "tents" of white colored Teflon-coated fiberglass fabric suspended from pylons, are grouped together into two blocks of five modules and separated by a landscaped mall between the blocks. Only customs, baggage handling and similar facilities are located in an air-conditioned building. The vast majority of the complex, called "Terminal Support Area", is a flexible, open area, conceived to function like a village, complete with souk (market) and mosque. Not enclosed by walls, this area is sheltered from the intense sun while allowing for natural ventilation; because of this, some consider it to be a green, environmentally-friendly building.

The Hajj Terminal received the Aga Khan Award for Architecture in 1983. According to the jury, "the brilliant and imaginative design of the roofing system met the awesome challenge of covering this vast space with incomparable elegance and beauty."

Other terminals

Jeddah-KAIA airport serves as a major hub for Saudia who originally had the exclusive use of the South Terminal. In 2007, however, the Saudi carriers Flynas and Sama Airlines were also given permission to use it. Due to the closure of Sama Airlines, the terminal was only used by Saudia and Flynas. The terminal is now also used by Flyadeal and Garuda Indonesia. The North Terminal at Jeddah airport is used by all other foreign airlines. The South terminal, is currently used for domestic flights. Meanwhile, Terminal 1 is currently used for International Flights.

Expansion project
The new King Abdulaziz International Airport three-stage development started in 2006, and is currently scheduled for an official opening in mid 2019.  However, as of 2018 local flights have been landing at the airport. The project is designed to increase the airport's yearly capacity from 13 million to 80 million passengers.

The expansion includes a brand-new passenger terminal building, a 136-meter tall air traffic control (ATC) tower (the largest in the world), airfield hard-standing and paved areas, lighting, fuel network systems, electronic passenger guidance system and a new storm water drainage network. There will also be a newly constructed support services building and upgrades to the existing runway and airfield systems. The three stages, according to GACA—the General Authority of Civil Aviation of Saudi Arabia, will be marked by staged capacity increase to 30 million, 60 million and 80 million passengers per year.

The new airport terminal 1 is accessed by the Haramain high-speed rail project network. Prince Majed Street will connect to the Al-Laith Highway, forming a fast north–south transit route.

Other facilities
The General Authority of Civil Aviation has the GACA Hangar (Building 364) at the airport.

Airlines and destinations

Passenger

Cargo

Accidents and incidents 
In November 1979, a Karachi bound Pakistan International Airlines flight crashed soon after takeoff when a fire started onboard. There were no survivors.
In 1986, a group of Iranian pilgrims were caught with C4 explosives in their bag. The explosives were put there by Iranian authorities; they wanted the explosives to go off killing many people. The pilgrims claimed that they didn't know anything about the explosives.
On 6 February 1991, a United States Air Force Boeing KC-135 Stratotanker made an emergency landing at the base after two of the KC-135's four engines ripped off, two tires bursted during the landing.
On 11 July 1991, Nigeria Airways Flight 2120, a Douglas DC-8-61, suffered cabin pressure problems followed by a fire due to a failed landing gear. The pilots tried to return to the airport but failed to reach it and the plane crashed, killing all 247 passengers and 14 crew.
On 1 March 2004, PIA Flight 2002, an Airbus A300B4-200, burst two tires whilst taking off. Fragments of the tire were ingested by the engines, causing the engines to catch fire and takeoff was aborted. Substantial damage to the engine and the left wing caused the aircraft to be written off. All 261 passengers and 12 crew survived.

Statistics

See also
 Haramain high-speed railway
 List of things named after Saudi kings
 King Fahd International Airport

References

External links

Information on the GACA website for the King Abdulaziz Int. Airport Development Project (KADP)

1981 establishments in Saudi Arabia
Airports established in 1981
Airports in Saudi Arabia
Buildings and structures in Jeddah
Transport in Jeddah
Fazlur Khan buildings